The Wolfson Institute for Biomedical Research at UCL is an academic department of the Faculty of Biomedical Sciences of University College London located in London, United Kingdom. The Institute is situated in the Cruciform Building, formerly the main building of University College Hospital, in the Bloomsbury district of Central London.

Originally named the Cruciform Project, its aim is to facilitate the interface between fundamental biological research and its application both to the discovery of new medicines and to clinical practice. The Institute now comprises more than 200 scientists, many of whom are of international standing.

History 
WIBR was established in 1995 as an Institute within UCL based in the Cruciform building, which underwent a £50 million renovation in order to create a modern infrastructure. Substantial grants to carry out the work were obtained from a number of funding bodies, notably The Wellcome Trust, the Higher Education Funding Council for England and The Wolfson Foundation and Charitable Family Trust.

The Institute Director was Prof. Salvador Moncada from 1995 - 2012. The current Institute Director is Dr. Beverley Clark

Research 
Research areas of the Institute include:
Molecular Nociception
Circuit Neuroscience
Neural development, plasticity and repair
Drug Discovery
Cortical Processing

In the 2008 Research Assessment Exercise the 75% of the Institute's research was rated 4* (world leading) or 3* (internationally excellent).

Education 
The Institute provides teaching for both undergraduates and postgraduates via both internal and external programmes.  Since 2010 a popular and very successful MSc in Drug Design is offered to life science graduates in biological sciences, chemical sciences and pharmacy.

See also
UCL Partners
Francis Crick Institute

References

External links 
UCL Wolfson Institute for Biomedical Research 
UCL School of Life and Medical Sciences

University College London